Nayan may refer to:

 Nayanthara (born 1984), Indian actress
 Nayan Desai (born 1946), Indian poet
 Nayan Mongia (born 1969), Indian cricketer
 Nayan Ghosh (born 1956), Indian musician
 Nayan Doshi (born 1978), British cricketer
 Nayan Shah, American professor
 Nayan Chanda (born 1946), Indian magazine editor
 Nayan (Mongol prince), 13th century prince of the Mongol Empire
 Nayan Padrai (born 1975), Indian screenwriter, producer, and director